Tatar  ( or ) is a Turkic language spoken by Tatars mainly located in modern Tatarstan (European Russia), as well as Siberia. It should not be confused with Crimean Tatar or Siberian Tatar, which are closely related but belong to different subgroups of the Kipchak languages.

Geographic distribution
The Tatar language is spoken in Russia (about 5.3 million people), Ukraine, China, Finland, Turkey, Uzbekistan, the United States of America, Romania, Azerbaijan, Israel, Kazakhstan, Georgia, Lithuania, Latvia and other countries. There are more than 7 million speakers of Tatar in the world.

Tatar is also native for several thousand Maris. Mordva's Qaratay group also speak a variant of Kazan Tatar.

In the 2010 census, 69% of Russian Tatars who responded to the question about language ability claimed a knowledge of the Tatar language. In Tatarstan, 93% of Tatars and 3.6% of Russians did so. In neighbouring Bashkortostan, 67% of Tatars, 27% of Bashkirs, and 1.3% of Russians did.

Official status

Tatar, along with Russian, is the official language of the Republic of Tatarstan. The official script of Tatar language is based on the Cyrillic script with some additional letters. The Republic of Tatarstan passed a law in 1999, which came into force in 2001, establishing an official Tatar Latin alphabet. A Russian federal law overrode it in 2002, making Cyrillic the sole official script in Tatarstan since. Unofficially, other scripts are used as well, mostly Latin and Arabic. All official sources in Tatarstan must use Cyrillic on their websites and in publishing. In other cases, where Tatar has no official status, the use of a specific alphabet depends on the preference of the author.

The Tatar language was made a de facto official language in Russia in 1917, but only within the Tatar Autonomous Soviet Socialist Republic. Tatar is also considered to have been the official language in the short-lived Idel-Ural State, briefly formed during the Russian Civil War.

The usage of Tatar declined from during the 20th century. By the 1980s, the study and teaching of Tatar in the public education system was limited to rural schools. However, Tatar-speaking pupils had little chance of entering university because higher education was available in Russian almost exclusively.

As of 2001 Tatar was considered a potentially endangered language while Siberian Tatar received "endangered" and "seriously endangered" statuses, respectively. Higher education in Tatar can only be found in Tatarstan, and is restricted to the humanities. In other regions Tatar is primarily a spoken language and the number of speakers as well as their proficiency tends to decrease. Tatar is popular as a written language only in Tatar-speaking areas where schools with Tatar language lessons are situated. On the other hand, Tatar is the only language in use in rural districts of Tatarstan.

Since 2017, Tatar language classes are no longer mandatory in the schools of Tatarstan. According to the opponents of this change, it will further endanger the Tatar language and is a violation of the Tatarstan Constitution which stipulates the equality of Russian and Tatar languages in the republic.

Dialects
There are two main dialects of Tatar:
 Central or Middle (Kazan)
 Western (Mişär or Mishar)

All of these dialects also have subdivisions. Significant contributions to the study of the Tatar language and its dialects, were made by a scientist Gabdulkhay Akhatov, who is considered to be the founder of the modern Tatar dialectological school.

Spoken idioms of Siberian Tatars, which differ significantly from the above two,  are often considered as the third dialect group of Tatar by some, but as an independent language on its own by others.

Central or Middle 
The Central or Middle dialectal group is spoken in Kazan and most of Tatarstan and is the basis of the standard literary Tatar language. Middle Tatar includes the Nagaibak dialect.

Mishar 

C is pronounced . There are no differences between v and w, q and k, g and ğ in the Mişär dialect. (The Cyrillic alphabet doesn't have special letters for q, ğ and w, so Mişär speakers have no difficulty reading Tatar written in Cyrillic.)

This is the dialect spoken by the Tatar minority of Finland.

Siberian Tatar 

There are also grammatical differences within the dialect, scattered across Siberia.

Many linguists claim the origins of Siberian Tatar dialects are actually independent of Volga–Ural Tatar; these dialects are quite remote both from Standard Tatar and from each other, often preventing mutual comprehension. The claim that this language is part of the modern Tatar language is typically supported by linguists in Kazan, Moscow and by Siberian Tatars linguists and denounced by some Russian and Tatar ethnographs.

Over time, some of these dialects were given distinct names and recognized as separate languages (e.g. the Chulym language) after detailed linguistic study. However, the Chulym language was never classified as a dialect of Tatar language. Confusion arose because of the endoethnonym "Tatars" used by the Chulyms. The question of classifying the Chulym language as a dialect of the Khakass language was debatable. A brief linguistic analysis shows that many of these dialects exhibit features which are quite different from the Volga–Ural Tatar varieties, and should be classified as Turkic varieties belonging to several sub-groups of the Turkic languages, distinct from Kipchak languages to which Volga–Ural Tatar belongs.

Phonology

Vowels

There exist several interpretations of the Tatar vowel phonemic inventory. In total Tatar has nine or ten native vowels, and three or four loaned vowels (mainly in Russian loanwords).

According to Baskakov (1988) Tatar has only two vowel heights, high and low. There are two low vowels, front and back, while there are eight high vowels: front and back, round (R+) and unround (R-), normal and short (or reduced).

Poppe (1963) proposed a similar yet slightly different scheme with a third, higher mid, height, and with nine vowels.

According to Makhmutova (1969) Tatar has three vowel heights: high, mid and low, and four tongue positions: front, front-central, front-back and back.

The mid back unrounded vowel 'ë is usually transcribed as ı, though it differs from the corresponding Turkish vowel.

The tenth vowel ï is realized as the diphthong ëy, which only occurs word-finally, but it has been argued to be an independent phoneme.

Phonetically, the native vowels are approximately thus (with the Cyrillic letters and the usual Latin romanization in angle brackets):

In polysyllabic words, the front-back distinction is lost in reduced vowels: all become mid-central. The mid reduced vowels in an unstressed position are frequently elided, as in кеше keşe  >  'person', or кышы qışı  >  '(his) winter'. Low back  is rounded  in the first syllable and after , but not in the last, as in бала bala  'child', балаларга balalarğa  'to children'.

Historical shifts
Historically, the Old Turkic mid vowels have raised from mid to high, whereas the Old Turkic high vowels have become the Tatar reduced mid series. (The same shifts have also happened in Bashkir.)

Consonants

Notes

However,  and  also appear before front  in Perso-Arabic loanwords which may indicate the phonemic status of these uvular consonants.

Palatalization
Tatar consonants usually undergo slight palatalization before front vowels. However, this allophony is not significant and does not constitute a phonemic status. This differs from Russian where palatalized consonants are not allophones but phonemes on their own. There are a number of Russian loanwords which have a palatalized consonants in Russian and thus written the same in Tatar (often with the "soft sign" ь). The Tatar standard pronunciation also requires palatalization in such loanwords, however, some Tatar may pronounce them non-palatalized.

Syllables
In native words there are six types of syllables (Consonant, Vowel, Sonorant):
 V (ı-lıs, u-ra, ö-rä)
 VC (at-law, el-geç, ir-kä)
 CV (qa-la, ki-ä, su-la)
 CVC (bar-sa, sız-law, köç-le, qoş-çıq)
 VSC (ant-lar, äyt-te, ilt-kän)
 CVSC (tört-te, qart-lar, qayt-qan)

Loanwords allow other types: CSV (gra-mota), CSVC (käs-trül), etc.

Prosody
Stress is usually on the final syllable.  However, some suffixes cannot be stressed, so the stress shifts to the syllable before that suffix, even if the stressed syllable is the third or fourth from the end. A number of Tatar words and grammatical forms have the natural stress on the first syllable. Loanwords, mainly from Russian, usually preserve their original stress (unless the original stress is on the last syllable, in such a case the stress in Tatar shifts to suffixes as usual, e.g. sovét > sovetlár > sovetlarğá).

Phonetic alterations
Tatar phonotactics dictate many pronunciation changes which are not reflected in the orthography.

 Unrounded vowels ı and e become rounded after o or ö:
коры/qorı > [qoro]
борын/borın > [boron]
көзге/közge > [közgö]
соры/sorı > [soro]

 Nasals are assimilated to the following stops:
унбер/unber > [umber]
менгеч/mengeç > [meñgeç]

 Stops are assimilated to the preceding nasals (this is reflected in writing):
урманнар/urmannar ( < urman + lar)
комнар/komnar ( < kom + lar)

 Voicing may also undergo assimilation:
күзсез/küzsez > [küssez]

 Unstressed vowels may be syncopated or reduced:
урыны/urını> [urnı]
килене/kilene > [kilne]

 Vowels may also be elided:
кара урман/qara urman > [qarurman]
килә иде/kilä ide > [kiläyde]
туры урам/turı uram > [tururam]
була алмыйм/bula almıym > [bulalmıym]

 In consonant clusters longer than two phones, ı or e (whichever is dictated by vowel harmony) is inserted into speech as an epenthetic vowel.
банк/bank > [bañqı]

 Final consonant clusters are simplified:
артист/artist > [artis]

 Final devoicing is also frequent:
табиб/tabib > [tabip]

Grammar
Like other Turkic languages, Tatar is an agglutinative language. Here is the grammar of Tatar:

Nouns
Tatar nouns are inflected for cases and numbers. Case suffixes change depending on last consonants of the noun, while nouns ending in п/к are voiced to б/г (китабым) when a possessive suffix was added. Suffixes below are in back vowel, with front variant can be seen at #Phonology section.

The declension of possessive suffixes is even more irregular, with the dative suffix -а used in 1st singular and 2nd singular suffixes, and the accusative, dative, locative, and ablative endings -н, -на, -нда, -ннан is used after 3rd person possessive suffix. Nouns ending in -и, -у, or -ү, although phonologically vowels, take consonantic endings.

 Declension of pronouns 
Declension of personal and demonstrative pronouns tends to be irregular. Irregular forms are in bold.

Verbs

The distribution of present tense suffix is complicated, with the former (also with vowel harmony) is used with verb stems ending in consonants, and latter is used with verb stem ending in vowels (with the last vowel being deleted,  — эшли, compare Turkish işlemek — continuous işliyor). The distribution of indefinite future tense is more complicated in consonant-ending stems, it is resolved by -арга/-ырга infinitives (язарга — язар). However, because some have verb citation forms in verbal noun (-у), this rule becomes somewhat unpredictable.

Tenses are negated with -ма, however in the indefinite future tense and the verbal participle they become -мас and -мыйча instead, respectively. Alongside with vowel-ending stems, the suffix also becomes -мый when negates the present tense. To form interrogatives, the suffix -мы is used.

Definite past and conditional tenses use type II personal inflections instead. When in the case of present tense, short ending (-м) is used. After vowels, the first person imperative forms deletes the last vowel, similar to the present tense does ( — эшлим). Like plurals of nouns, the suffix -лар change depending the preceding consonants (-алар, but -ганнар).

Some verbs, however, have irregular imperative forms by adding a final historic vowel ( — укы,  — төзе'''), instead of leaving the verb's stem.

Predicatives

These predicative suffixes now fallen into disuse, or rarely used.

Writing system

During its history, Tatar has been written in Arabic, Latin and Cyrillic scripts.

Before 1928, Tatar was mostly written with in Arabic script (Иске имля/İske imlâ, "Old orthography", to 1920; Яңа имла/Yaña imlâ, "New orthography", 1920–1928).

During the 19th century Russian Christian missionary Nikolay Ilminsky devised the first Cyrillic alphabet for Tatar. This alphabet is still used by Christian Tatars (Kryashens).

In the Soviet Union after 1928, Tatar was written with a Latin alphabet called Jaꞑalif.

In 1939, in Tatarstan and all other parts of the Soviet Union, a Cyrillic script was adopted and is still used to write Tatar. It is also used in Kazakhstan.

The Republic of Tatarstan passed a law in 1999 that came into force in 2001 establishing an official Tatar Latin alphabet. A Russian federal law overrode it in 2002, making Cyrillic the sole official script in Tatarstan since. In 2004, an attempt to introduce a Latin-based alphabet for Tatar was further abandoned when the Constitutional Court ruled that the federal law of 15 November 2002 mandating the use of Cyrillic for the state languages of the republics of the Russian Federation does not contradict the Russian constitution. In accordance with this Constitutional Court ruling, on 28 December 2004, the Tatar Supreme Court overturned the Tatarstani law that made the Latin alphabet official.

In 2012 the Tatarstan government adopted a new Latin alphabet but with limited usage (mostly for Romanization).

 Tatar Perso-Arabic alphabet (before 1928):

 Tatar Old Latin (Jaꞑalif) alphabet (1928 to 1940), including a digraph in the last position:

 Tatar Old Cyrillic alphabet (by Nikolay Ilminsky, 1861; the letters in parenthesis are not used in modern publications):

 Tatar Cyrillic alphabet (1939; the letter order adopted in 1997):

 1999 Tatar Latin alphabet, made official by a law adopted by Tatarstani authorities but annulled by the Tatar Supreme Court in 2004:

 2012 Tatar Latin alphabet

History

Tatar's ancestors are the extinct Bulgar and Kipchak languages.

The literary Tatar language is based on the Middle Tatar dialect and on the Old Tatar language (İske Tatar Tele). Both are members of the Volga-Ural subgroup of the Kipchak group of Turkic languages, although they also partly derive from the ancient Volga Bulgar language.

Most of the Uralic languages in the Volga River area have strongly influenced the Tatar language, as have the Arabic, Persian and Russian languages.

Crimean Tatar, although similar by name, belongs to another subgroup of the Kipchak languages. Unlike Kazan Tatar, Crimean Tatar is heavily influenced by Turkish.

Examples
Universal Declaration of Human Rights, Article 1:

See also
Corpus of Written Tatar
Tatar alphabet
Tatar name
Tatars

Notes

Further reading

Bukharaev, R., & Matthews, D. J. (2000). Historical anthology of Kazan Tatar verse: voices of eternity. Richmond, Surrey: Curzon. 
PEN (Organization). (1998). Tatar literature today. Kazan: Magarif Publishers.
Poppe, N. N. (1963). Tatar manual: descriptive grammar and texts with a Tatar-English glossary. Bloomington: Indiana University.
 Ахатов Г. Х. Татарская диалектология (учебник для студентов вузов). — Казань, 1984.
 Татарская грамматика. В 3-х т. / Гл. ред. М. З. Закиев. — Казань, 1993.
Gilmetdinova A, Malova I. 'Language education for glocal interaction: English and Tatar.' World Englishes'' 37(3)  2018;1–11. https://doi.org/10.1111/weng.12324

External links
  Atlas of Tatar dialects
 Tatar<>Turkish dictionary

 
Agglutinative languages
Languages of Azerbaijan
Languages of China
Languages of Finland
Languages of Kazakhstan
Languages of Russia
Languages of Turkey
Languages of Ukraine
Languages of Uzbekistan
Turkic languages
Vowel-harmony languages